Bucklands Beach is a suburb  east of Auckland's CBD in New Zealand. The suburb is in the Howick ward, one of the thirteen administrative divisions of Auckland Council.

Demographics

Bucklands Beach had a population of 9,042 at the 2018 New Zealand census, an increase of 225 people (2.6%) since the 2013 census, and an increase of 444 people (5.2%) since the 2006 census. There were 2,919 households, comprising 4,446 males and 4,593 females, giving a sex ratio of 0.97 males per female, with 1,662 people (18.4%) aged under 15 years, 1,812 (20.0%) aged 15 to 29, 4,317 (47.7%) aged 30 to 64, and 1,257 (13.9%) aged 65 or older.

Ethnicities were 51.1% European/Pākehā, 3.3% Māori, 2.2% Pacific peoples, 45.3% Asian, and 3.3% other ethnicities. People may identify with more than one ethnicity.

The percentage of people born overseas was 55.2, compared with 27.1% nationally.

Although some people chose not to answer the census's question about religious affiliation, 48.2% had no religion, 35.3% were Christian, 0.1% had Māori religious beliefs, 2.6% were Hindu, 2.1% were Muslim, 3.2% were Buddhist and 3.1% had other religions.

Of those at least 15 years old, 2,385 (32.3%) people had a bachelor's or higher degree, and 756 (10.2%) people had no formal qualifications. 1,599 people (21.7%) earned over $70,000 compared to 17.2% nationally. The employment status of those at least 15 was that 3,489 (47.3%) people were employed full-time, 1,119 (15.2%) were part-time, and 252 (3.4%) were unemployed.

History

Māori

This area of Auckland was populated by Māori of the Ngai Tai iwi until the start of the Musket Wars (sometimes called the Potato Wars) which started in 1807. The old pā at Musick point was called Te Waiarohia and was used perhaps as far back as 1450. The last chief to command this pā was Te Rangi-Tauhia from about 1790. The old Māori name for Eastern Beach was Okokino; for big Bucklands Beach Te Komiti and for little Bucklands Beach Waio-otaiki. All these areas show signs of being used for Māori crops of kumara and bracken fern. These same areas had extensive hangi (earth oven) sites.

The Auckland area came under regular attack by Taua or war parties from the Ngāpuhi iwi in Northland. In 1821 a large musket armed Ngapuhi war party devastated the eastern area of Auckland attacking Mokoia Pā at Panmure. By the 1830s many of the local Māori had been killed or enslaved by their deadly enemies to the north. In 1926 Geoff Fairfield, the great-grandson of Alfred Buckland and a keen historian, drew a detailed scaled map of the pā. The main isthmus of Auckland was also depopulated by Māori migrating south to avoid the regular carnage. The Tamaki River, to the west of Bucklands Beach, became a main highway for attacking Taua or those seeking revenge (utu) from previous attacks.

In 1835 minor conflict had occurred in the area and threatened to erupt into full-scale war. William Thomas Fairburn, the CMS missionary, attempted to solve the issues for nearly a year. The price paid to 3 local chiefs was 10 blankets, 24 axes, 26 hoes, 14 spades, $80,  of tobacco, 24 cobs and 12 plane irons. The value of the goods was about 907 pounds and 17 shillings and 6 pence. The 3 hapu who sold the land were Ngatitawaki, Urikaraka and Matekiwaho. The principal chiefs who signed the sale were Herua, Te Waru, Hauauru and Te Tara. The Treaty of Waitangi was signed at Karaka Bay on the Tamaki River opposite Big Bucklands Beach in 1840 by Capt Hobson and Ngati Paoa.
After the treaty signing the Fairburn purchase was examined by the government, who determined that Fairburn could keep 1/7 of the land, with the rest being claimed by the government, who later sold it on in smaller blocks.

Europeans

The first European to farm this area was Fairburn, New Zealand's first architect. He sold  to William Mason in 1851 for 500 pounds, but the deed for the land was not processed until 6 September 1852. The land included most of the peninsula apart from what is now Musick Point, which was reserved for the crown. Originally Eastern Beach was named Masons Beach. He sowed fine English grasses and grazed mainly sheep. In 1850 William Mason was elected one of the three wardens of the Howick "hundred". The "hundred" was an ancient English administrative unit. He was one of three wardens who decided how the income gained for licenses to grazing cattle would be spent. The term hundred only lasted until 1865, when it was changed to Highway Trustees. Mason bought the first flour windmill built in 1843 by John Bycroft in Auckland at Epsom (on the corner of Mindmill Rd and St Andrews Rd). Because it was some distance from the wheat farmers in the Howick district, some of them made simple mortars and pestles to grind their own flour. Later Mason moved the mill to Princess St. Onehunga in 1854, where there was a natural spring.

When The Royal New Zealand Fencibles arrived at Howick in September 1847, they were  very isolated. The Howick Fencibles established several routes to Auckland. One went to Bucklands Beach, where they were taken by a ferry across to Pt England by a farmer,  Mr Stephens. In 1852 the cutters Alert and Thetis provided a regular service between Auckland and Panmure stopping at Mr Masons at Bucklands Beach and Point England, two or three times per week. A return ticket was 4/-(shillings).   Alfred Buckland, who had 21 children, bought the farm in 1861 for 2,500 pounds plus 150 pounds per annum to go to Mason and his wife Sarah, who lived another 35 years. Buckland was a successful businessman. The beach was named after him.  At one stage he owned land in the area, and also owned land situated at what is now the commercial district of Newmarket. In the late 19th century and around the turn of the 20th century, Buckland farmed ostriches at Bucklands Beach. The feathers were sold for hat decoration.

The Bucklands also had a brickmaking plant at the north end of Little Bucklands Beach near the old Bucklands Beach Yacht Club house in  1869. The brick works was owned by a Mr Spencer and managed by John Granger, who had arrived in New Zealand in 1865 to try his luck at the Thames goldfields (LaRoche 1991). He was a brickmaker by trade. Part bricks and field tiles can still be found at the northern end of Little Bucklands Beach, although many were buried by the dumping of material between the rock retaining wall and the roadside grass strip. It is possible that both bricks and field tiles were being made. The bricks were possibly used to line wells in the area. Various old wells can be found around Bucklands Beach such as at 31 and 42 The Parade, 23 Hattaway Ave next to the R.O.W., 15 Sunderlands Road, the site of an old farmstead, and by the supermarket at Highlands Park. The brickworks closed in 1878, when Granger bought the equipment and moved to Whitford Creek. The area was sometimes referred to as Grangers Point.
One of the first (possibly the first) buildings on Bucklands Beach was a large boathouse built on the land at 44 The Parade by Mrs Biss. The building is evident in a 1910 photo.

Development

Granger has a street in Howick named after him. In 1878 the brickworks was sold and Granger bought the equipment and set up a large brickworks at the head of the Whitford Creek in Whitford. They also ran a lime factory based on crushing and burning shells at Eastern Beach. Shells lay in beds several metres thick on the flats which extend 400 m inland from the beach. The factory was  built on a concrete base about 20 metres by 15 metres by 1.4 metres thick on the seaward side on the waterfront, 30 m south of the intersection by the restaurant. The site is now marked by a short wooden walkway under the phoenix palm trees. The shells were burnt for 3 days at a temperature of about 800 °C to turn the solid shells into lime when it was mixed with fresh water. The three kilns were beehive-shaped, about 1.8 m high. Alongside the factory, a long wooden jetty went 10 metres out to deeper water. A flat-bottomed sailing scow was bought in on the high tide, loaded, then floated off on the next high tide. The shell was brought to the kilns on a miniature railway. One of the early workers at the lime works was Alexander Shaw, who had migrated from Ireland and initially worked at the Coromandel gold fields. Alexander later worked at  Granger's bricks works when it moved to Turanga (Whitford). Workers came from Howick, walking around the Mellons Bay cliff base when the tide allowed. About 50 m west of the beach are some noticeable depressions in the shell soil near no 19, where many hundreds of tonnes of shells were removed. The lime produced was used for mortar, lime render and for tanning leather.

Another link with Whitford was ostriches. These were brought to Whitford by the L.D. Nathan family, who had a large farm originally called Whit Forde and bred ostriches for feathers, which were a high-fashion article on hats in the 1890s. Some of the ostriches were bought by Alfred Buckland's family to Bucklands Beach, where they were grazed.

The first shop built at Bucklands beach was built by the Hindman family about 1910 on the waterfront road facing the Tamaki River called The Parade. The wooden shop was in the front with a hall at the rear. Much later it became known as the centre dairy. About 1930 the shop/hall complex was run by the Hughes family, who were bakers in Howick. They sold to the Farquar family, who lived in a small cottage on the steep section of Bucklands Beach Road near Wharf Road, above the present community centre hall. The Farquars were a military family, and about 1947 they returned to India for about a year to help in the development of the new Indian Army and rented out the cottage. Later in the 1950s it was run by the Kennedy family. Mrs Kennedy ran the local cub group that operated from the old Presbyterian church in Whitcombe Road that was removed in the 1970s.

In 1910 there were about 8 permanent houses at big Bucklands Beach. A toilet and changing rooms was built about 100m south of Hindman's store set back about 40m from the beach on The Parade. A modernized facility is still there today. The shop mainly catered for the holiday trippers who came by boat and to a lesser extent by car. In summer people would camp in tents at the base of the steep bank under the pine trees that had been planted along the cliff east of Hattaway Ave and the steep section of Bucklands Beach Road.

About 1914 photos show the Buckland farm making use of horses to drill seed for oats, for pulling a heavy 2-horse dray (cart )when harvesting wheat and oats and for pulling a light 2-wheeled buggy called a phaeton (possibly better described as a gig). The large 2-story Buckland homestead which had a deep verandah on both sides had a large barn for hay, a pigsty, milksheds and lean-to where the buggy was stored. About 1910 a bullock team was used to pull logs from a pine plantation from Eastern Beach A few remaining trees from the plantation still exist on the steep slope to the north of the soccer fields at Vic Rogers Park.

On Friday 31 March 1916, Alfred Buckland and Son held an auction to sell some 126 sections on the western side of the peninsula stretching from big Bucklands Beach in the North to the cliffs at the southern end of little Bucklands Beach. The poster for the auction shows the peninsula was mainly grassland but with 3 areas of planted trees—along the length of Eastern Beach, on the steep slopes east of the Bucklands Beach centreboard yacht clubhouse and on the steep cliffs east of Wharf Road. The white shell road is visible down the centre of the peninsula and the wooden wharf is clearly visible extending about 15 m into the river. Phoenix palms were planted along Eastern Beach at this time to give the peninsula an exotic atmosphere.

After World War I two boats owned by the Waiheke ferry company used to bring day trippers in summer to Bucklands Beach to unload at the wharf at Wharf Road. The main boat used was the launch Olive Jean, built in 1919 No 136876. Another boat was the Olivene, which was a sailing boat. The Buckland family, which had extensive livestock interests, would bring in cattle from the outlying gulf islands and unload them at Bucklands Beach. The cattle had to jump into the water and swim ashore to the beach. From here they were moved to be sold at Newmarket. About 1938 a cabaret, called Chez Paris, was built on the corner of Wharf Road and the Parade. It was not very successful as a cabaret due to petrol rationing in World War II and was turned into a dance hall, with a small shop at the front. A youth club was also run from the hall.

Bucklands Beach was served by a single bus in the 1920s and 30s known as "the Sheik" which ran into the city and returned with city workers. The bus was a 36-seater Daimler Charbanc operated by Mrs Laird in the 1920s. This bus was sold and used in the South Seas Exhibition of 1925–26. In the late 1920s the Otahuhu-based Passenger Transport Service operated a service from Otahuhu, Papatoetoe to Bucklands Beach until 1939. A former employee Mr Tom Hadfield took over the service and founded the Bucklands and Eastern Bus Co Ltd running buses into central Auckland. He had 2 buses loaned from the Passenger Transport Company which during wartime restrictions were converted to run on a mix of petrol and kerosine. Repairs to the buses were done at night to keep them running and the tyres pumped up by hand. The fare was 2/6 (25 cents) for adults and 2d(2-3 cents) for children. In the late 1930s a bus took youngsters to Howick to attend pictures at the Monterey Theatre. The route to Howick was via the small Pakuranga post office, which stood on farm land opposite the present western entrance to Pakuranga College. In those days Maclean Road was just a grass walking track. The Bucklands and Eastern Bus company grew from this with its headquarters next to the bowling green at the foot of Devon Rd. From 1962 this was managed  by the Wells family who lived opposite the headquarters in Devon Road. Both the Howick and the Bucklands /Eastern buses were owned by Mrs Cherry (formerly Mrs Hadfeld).
About 1940 the Roberts family who lived at Pakuranga built a brick home cookery on the corner of Devon Rd and The Parade. The Robert's daughters were both very good cooks. The bakery was very popular with American servicemen on leave during World War II.

Agriculture

From 1935 the central peninsula including the area of the present primary school was farmed by Pop (Herbert) and Edith Ellen Leach, Edith Leach's parents Nan and Frederick Burton, who had accompanied their daughter Edith to New Zealand in 1919 from Kent, England, and their children Allan, Bert, Gladys, Joan and Mick, who ran a dairy herd of 30–40 cows. The Burton/Leaches lived in the old 2-story Buckland managers homestead which was located on the rise in what is now Clovelly Road, at about number 151D. An old concrete structure referred to as the dairy was still on the site up to the 1963 development. This was a solid concrete structure about 4m by 5m by 3m high, with a wooden floor that had rotted away. The concrete used the shelly sand off a local beach. In the 1960s there was no roof left. Next to the house was a large wooden barn. The cowshed was located on the flat area near the present tennis club near Eastern Beach at about 7 Jern Place. Attached to the cowshed was accommodation for a farm worker or people on holiday at Eastern Beach. As the Leach/Burton family had the use of the large Buckland house this was not needed so the bach was let out to extended family or friends such as the Pattens over the holidays. Frederick Burton died  and the herd was sold during World War II. The Buckland house, which was in a poor state, was pulled down. The Leaches moved to a  house at 31 The Parade.

The original holiday home of Alfred Buckland, his wife  and their 13 children was a simple house  at 125 Bucklands Beach Road overlooking Eastern Beach from the ridge. The house still exists, although it has been raised and modernised.

The north tip of the peninsula, which was originally called East Head by the early settlers, was a dairy farm called Westend. The milking shed for Westend was at the lower or south end of Musick Pt Road on an area of flat land adjacent to a small creek about 50 metres from the beach. The cottage on this property (near the water tower) had fallen into decay by the 1930s and was uninhabitable -it was known to the locals as the "rats nest". At the south end of the peninsula were 2 farms the one on the eastern side, roughly on the same land as Macleans College, was run by the Trusdale family. This was the farm originally owned by the Maclean brothers in the 19th century. In the centre of the peninsula, in the vicinity of Sea Spray Drive was a farm run by the Redgrave family and later in the 1950s, the Benton family. The milking shed was down a 100-metre drive at 205 Bucklands Beach Road.

Along with a few retired people such as Mr Morrow and Geoff Fairfield (a great-grandson of the original Bucklands who lived alongside each other at the old Bucklands Beach Yacht club at 56 The Parade), these were the only permanent families at the beach although in summer many people came to stay in their baches. Mr Morrow was famous for making wind driven models of people engaged in various activities such as fishing and sawing wood which he put on his front fence. He had a donations box with the money going to charity. These models were still working in the late 1950s. The most well known was a model of a woman beating a carpet with the caption below "Work like Helen be happy". The Leaches' cows were taken to the milking shed which was located at Eastern Beach near the present Tennis club. In the very early days there was no road to Bucklands Beach but by the 1930s roads on the beach were made of shells. After World War II the farmland at Bucklands Beach was mainly used for drystock up until 1963 when the land was subdivided for sections. The Bentons were the last farmers to actually farm the land.
Bucklands Beach has always been an attractive place for holiday makers.

Racing club

Before World War I a steamer, the Wakatere, ran from the city to the old 20-metre-long wooden jetty at the end of Wharf Road (the old piles are still visible after a storm). The Bucklands established a private oval horse race track in the flat area near Hattaway Avenue. The front straight was on Morrow Avenue and lower Devon Road was the south end of the oval. It had a permanent start/finish box elevated on piles 10 metres above the track at the lower end of Lynton Road. This was a location of the Auckland Racing Club. The first recorded meeting was in 1864 when his horse owning neighbours in Howick were invited to compete. In 1889 a totalizator meeting was organized with the help of the Pakuranga Hunt to help celebrate the end of a severe recession. At that time the track was called the East Tamaki Racing Course. In the summers of the 1920s, car owning Aucklanders would make the long trip from the city dressed in their finery to watch the racing. In the 1920s and 1930s well-off Aucklanders such as the Pattens bought sections and constructed baches near the beaches where they lived over summer. Cliff Patten was a farrier who had strong connections with the horse racing fraternity. He worked for Bucklands Stock and Station Agents  and became familiar with the area when the Bucklands ran their annual Christmas trip by boat to Bucklands Beach in the 1920s. He built a bach by the Beach on the Parade in 1928.

World War II

During World War II when it was feared the city may be bombed some families moved to Bucklands Beach on a semi permanent basis. Other families at the beach then were the Burgesses, the Inders, the Hancocks and the Eliots. About 1942 just after the Japanese entered the war, the wooden bridge at Wharf road was taken down to stop a landing by Japanese. Concrete pillboxes were built at each end of Eastern Beach on the clifftops by Herbert (Pop) Leach, an ex-World War I signaler and local farmer with his sons Bert, Allan and Mick. Metal and concrete was provided by Winstones Ltd, and the material was brought to the sites by the Leach's horse-drawn sledge. The home guard with the help of the regular army set up barbed wire entanglements at local beaches. Because rumours of submarines were rife in 1941, the local home guard platoon had an exercise to walk from Mangere to Bucklands Beach. The Leach's provided accommodation in the old two-story Alfred Buckland homestead. In the 1950s the baby boom at the end of the war saw a growth in the number of children and a bach owned by the Trusdale family was converted into a one-room barbers shop complete with pole, on Wharf Road next to the Community Centre hall. This was known as Bert the Barbers. The barbers was demolished in the early 1960s. It was located where the present plunket rooms are now.

Postwar

In the early days before World War II the beach had a very small permanent population centred around five farms and a few retired people, though in summer the population would be much bigger as there were many baches. After World War II the population grew steadily as the Bucklands sold off parcels of land for subdivision. When the primary school started in 1955 with a roll of about 180, the population was about 1000. The biggest growth came with widespread subdivision between 1963 and 1970.

The first large-scale sale of sections took place in 1947 to take advantage of returned servicemen and the baby boom. A regular bus service took passengers to the city. The Bucklands estate lawyers sold sections for 175–200 pounds. The second large sale of sections took place in 1963. Sections then cost 2000–2500 pounds. Walking tracks were made so that pedestrians could  walk more directly to the various beaches. These 3m wide tracks still exist today. After World War II a group of enthusiastic locals started a centreboard yacht club which was run from a portable shack stored at the community centre and carried across the road to the beach each Sunday in summer. The early classes were Z and Idle alongs on the 1950s which were gradually replaced by lighter, faster yachts such a P, Cherubs, Flying Ants and Moths in the 1970s and 80s. By the 1990s many of these classes were in turn replaced by various boardsailing classes and Optimist dinghies.

Geography

Bucklands Beach sits at the northern end of a peninsula between the Tamaki River to the west and the Hauraki Gulf to the east. At the peninsula's northernmost point, Musick Point juts into the gulf. This was named after Captain Musick, an American who pioneered long range flying boat travel. At the tip of this peninsula is an old Maori Pā formerly occupied by a branch of the Tainui iwi. The Pa is sometimes referred to as Te Naupata. Some of the ancient ditches are still just visible. They should not be confused with the World War II trenches built in the vicinity of a concrete bunker. These were built after the Japanese attack on Pearl Harbor in 1941. An anti aircraft gun was located at the site to protect Musick Point long range (short wave) radio station (built in 1940). The radio communications station, one of a NZ coastal network serving aircraft and shipping, was established at the point to escape the interference experienced in the Auckland chief Post Office created by the nearby electric tram system's overhead wires. A golf course now occupies the end of the peninsula. The tip of the peninsula is a reserve open to the public. It has extensive views over the inner gulf and is a favourite location for wedding photos.

Beaches

Locals divide the beaches into:

 Big Bucks (from the old yacht club at Grangers Point northwards)
 Little Bucks (from the yacht club at Grangers Point southwards)
 Eastern Beach
 The Back Beach (series of small coves at the base of the cliffs north of Eastern beach). This is accessed by a steep, unstable track off Clovelly Road. This track was destroyed in a winter storm in 2009 but has been replaced by a new track in 2010 located about 500m further north.

Browns Island

Five hundred metres north off the tip of the peninsula is Browns Island (Motukorea). It has a central volcanic crater which spewed lava to the SW forming a flatter area. This area was made into a stone garden by Maori in pre European times. The dark volcanic rocks were piled up to clear the ground and make walls. This created a micro climate suitable for Kumara and gourds. There are many mussel beds around the SW shore so landing is difficult. The walls are still clearly visible. The best landing site is on the Northern side by the short cliff but it is protected by a number of submerged rocks. The whole island is open to the public. No commercial ferries go to the island.

Industry

At the northern end of Big Bucklands Beach is one of the oldest industrial sites in New Zealand. At the point just south of where the beach turns to the north east, about 300 metres north of the boat ramp, is a beach area littered with stone debris from a Maori adze making "factory". Local historian Geoff Fairfield found fully formed or partly formed rock adzes of Ardulite (a heavy and dense volcanic rock) here in the 1960s. These were given to Auckland museum.

Estuary

The 15 kilometres long Tamaki River to the west is a semi sheltered estuary much used by boaties especially since World War II. At its mouth the estuary is 500 metres wide but the 20-metre-deep (chart) channel is only 50 metres wide. The channel is clearly marked by large buoys as it winds its way 15 kilometres in a general southwards direction. At the large Point England sand spit, opposite the old yacht club, boats should keep to the 50 metre channel, as water over the spit is very shallow even at high tide. Three kilometres up the river is the large Half Moon Bay Marina, the Bucklands Beach Yacht club rooms and small shopping centre. At low water the current in the channel is very strong travelling up to 8 km/h by the sand spit. Hundreds of small craft are moored in the river but the channel is clear. During summer the river traffic is very heavy, even at night. Ferries leave on a regular basis during the day for the city, Waiheke and Great Barrier Island from Half Moon Bay Marina. The speed limit in the river is 10 km/h. Large vessels should watch out for small centre board yachts and windsurfers which frequent the mouth of the estuary in summer.

Facilities

Bucklands Beach has a number of dispersed shops and facilities. Also there is an old scout hall at the base of Devon Road. Opposite this is an outdoor bowling club. On Wharf Road is a community centre hall and Plunket rooms. This was built in 1965 on the site of the old hall/dairy Chez Paris which burnt down after a fire in the cinema projection box in the 1960s.

At Eastern Beach there is a sports ground (Rogers Park) named after Vic Rogers, a long serving local member of the former Manukau County Council in the 1950s and 60s, is used for junior soccer and a tennis club and courts. On the rocky area, named Grangers Point, between Big and Little Bucklands Beach is a yacht club rooms for centre board boats, boat ramp and hauling out hard stand which was built in 1962. In 2007 a huge holding tank was constructed under the hard stand to hold the surplus sewage from beach side houses. Eastern Beach has a large Christian Youth camp which hires out its facilities to schools. At one stage the beach had three garages but all have closed now. Until the 1980s Bucklands Beach had its own post office, next to the community centre hall but this was shut down and removed by barge to Waiheke Island. In the 1950s Miss Tonks ran a library from a small building, that had previously been a garage, on the steep frontage of her property at the North end of Bucklands Beach Road near the Community hall. This little building about 4m x 3m, was so frequently crowded with customers they could barely walk around. Midway between the two restaurants at big Bucklands Beach was a dairy and hall complex called Westend (named after the farm at the tip of the peninsula). The hall was used for local dances in the 1930s and 1940s during the summer holidays.

The hall had a dairy at the front and bach style accommodation for the shop keeper. In the 1950s the hall was turned into a full size house attached to the shop. The shop had a tiny post office that was the main PO before the stand-alone post office was built just south of Chez Paris. At the Xmas dance Pop (Herbert senior) Leach, who was the normal MC, would get dressed in a Santa's costume and hide in the hall ceiling - descending by ladder to give the children presents. The old Westend building was pulled down in the 1970s. Between the 1950s and the 1970s there was a butcher's shop and a small doctor's rooms about 100 metres north of the intersection of Wharf Rd and Hattaways Ave. Both have been pulled down.

Boat Ramps
There are boat ramps Eastern Beach (high tide only). This is to serve the dedicated water ski area towards the south end of the beach. A double ramp at Bucklands Beach Yacht Club (all tide) at Grangers Point for boats up to 6m. Avoid dead low tide. This ramp is exposed to the normal south to westerly wind. Not good if the wind is greater than 15 km/h. A single narrow ramp at Bucklands Beach north by the Buck's Bistro restaurant (all tide) sited to boats up to 6m for confident backers. There are four ramps with loading jetties at Half Moon Bay Marina (all tide) that are well protected from the prevailing south to west wind. This last ramp is very popular and parking is an issue in the weekends.

Boardwalk

In 2010 a new 230 metre long Warren boardwalk  has been built between the southern end of Little Bucklands Beach and the eastern end of the Half Moon Bay Marina hardstand, along the base of the Takutai Avenue cliff. The boardwalk is located on the wavecut platform that is uncovered at half tide. This  allows easy pedestrian and cycle access to the new Half Moon Bay shopping centre and joins the walkways that follows the southern bank of the Tamaki River. Weeds have been removed from the steep cliff and new native plants established.

Nearby Shops

The nearest shopping centre and garage, with petrol, is at Highland Park.

Past and present churches
Bucklands Beach has had a wide range of churches. The oldest was St Brides, an Anglican church, constructed in the 1930s. A hall was added in 1952, built by voluntary labour headed by carpenter Mick (RR) Leach (the youngest son of Herbert (Pop) Leach. The church was moved in the 1970s. A Presbyterian Church ran in a hall between the 1950s and the 1970s when it was pulled down. Nearby at 121 Bucklands Beach Road a brick Catholic church was built by a local builder Mr Keryns in 1954. This fell into disuse in the 1970s and was purchased by Barbara Kendall (Bright) the New Zealand, World and Olympic champion board sailor, who intended to turn it into a dance studio. Because of her board sailing success it became her New Zealand home base in the 1980s. At Mobil corner, on Bucklands Beach Road, a breakaway conservative group built the Reformed Presbyterian Church which had an American pastor in the 1960s. This is still in operation. In the 1980s St Johns co-operating church was built 200 metres further south on Bucklands Beach Road. This is largely an Anglican church and is very active.

Education
In the early pioneering days when most students only had primary school education. Children from Bucklands Beach attended the Pakuranga School which was located near the junction of Bucklands Beach Road and the Howick -Pakuranga Highway near the Fencibles Soccer Club. Students would often ride to school with 2 or 3 on one horse. Later when the Howick District High school was built the students went there. Attendance at school was patchy as older children were required for work on their farms.

Until Macleans College opened in the 1980s secondary students attended Pakuranga College adjacent to Highland Park.

Macleans College is a secondary school  (years 9–13) with a roll of  students.

All these schools are coeducational. Rolls are as of

References

Geoff Fairfield. Local production History booklet; History of Bucklands Beach
Oral History recorded by LC Leach
Treaty of Waitangi document translation, Victoria University
Crosby R. Musket Wars
Allan LaRoche. The History of Howick and Pakuranga. The Howick and District Historical Society, 1991

External links
Photographs of Bucklands Beach held in Auckland Libraries' heritage collections.

Suburbs of Auckland
Populated places on the Tāmaki River
Beaches of the Auckland Region
Howick Local Board Area